Jonathan Paul Harvey (born 13 June 1968) is an English screen actor and playwright.

Life and works
Harvey was born at Liverpool, Lancashire in 1968 to Maureen and Brian Harvey. He has a brother, Timothy, who is a music teacher in Chester. A former secondary school English teacher, his first serious attempt as a playwright was in 1987. He entered a competition, with a first prize of £1,000, for young writers at the Liverpool Playhouse, with his play The Cherry Blossom Tree, a blend of suicide, murder and nuns. He won National Girobank Young Writer of the Year Award for The Cherry Blossom Tree. 

Encouraged by this success he wrote Mohair (1988), Wildfire (1992) and Babies (1993), the latter won the 'George Devine Award' for 1993 and The Evening Standard's 'Most Promising Playwright Award' for 1994. In 1993, Harvey, premiered Beautiful Thing, a gay-themed play-turned-film for which he won the John Whiting Award in 1994.

In 1995 his play Boom Bang-a-Bang premiered at the Bush Theatre, London, and was originally directed by Kathy Burke. Harvey cites it as "my most comic play ever, but with some dark bits". Centred on a group of friends gathering to watch the Eurovision Song Contest, the play was a sell-out. Also in 1995 Rupert Street Lonely Hearts Club was premiered. Guiding Star (1998), is a portrayal of a man's struggle to come to terms with the Hillsborough disaster, while Hushabye Mountain (1999) deals with a world that has learned to live with HIV/AIDS. Television and film works include: West End Girls (Carlton); Love Junkie (BBC); Beautiful Thing (Channel Four/Island World Productions); the 1999-2001 hit/cult comedy series starring Kathy Burke and James Dreyfus, Gimme Gimme Gimme (Tiger Aspect); Murder Most Horrid (BBC); and Coronation Street (ITV).

He wrote the book for Closer to Heaven, a stage musical with songs and music written by Pet Shop Boys. Closer to Heaven ran for nine months at the Arts Theatre in London during 2001 and in Australia in 2005. In 2003, on hearing the singer-actress Abi Roberts perform, he offered to write a solo show for her. Taking Charlie was the outcome, staged at the 2004 Edinburgh Festival with Roberts starring, under the direction of Susan Tully. The piece was darkly comic and focused on the destructive nature of an insecure, 30 year-old addict.

His first novel All She Wants was published in 2012 by Pan Books.

Since 2013, Harvey has co-written the Radio Four sitcom series What Does the K Stand For? based on the experiences of comedian Stephen K. Amos growing up as a teenager in south London in the 1980s. The programme's third series commenced in January 2017.

Harvey is married to casting director Paul Hunt.

Works

Plays

2023: Mother Goose
2020: Our Lady of Blundellsands
2012: Panto!
2010:  Canary (2010) (Playhouse Theatre, Liverpool/Hampstead Theatre, London)
2004:  Taking Charlie (2004)
2001:  Out in the Open (2001)
1999:  Hushabye Mountain (1999)
1998:  Guiding Star (1998)
1995:  Rupert Street Lonely Hearts Club (1995)
1995:  Boom Bang-A-Bang (Bush Theatre, 1995); Rupert Street Lonely Hearts Club (English Touring Theatre/Contact Theatre Company, Donmar Warehouse/Criterion Theatre, London, 1995).
1994:  Babies (Royal National Theatre Studio/Royal Court Theatre, 1994), winner George Devine Award 1993 and Evening Standard's Most Promising Playwright Award 1994.
1993:  Beautiful Thing (Bush Theatre, London, 1993 and Donmar Warehouse, London/Duke of York's Theatre, London, 1994), winner of the John Whiting Award 1994.
1992:  Wildfire (Royal Court Theatre Upstairs, 1992).
1988:  Mohair (Royal Court Young Writers Festival, London/International Festival of Young Playwrights, Sydney, 1988).
1987:  The Cherry Blossom Tree (Liverpool Playhouse Studio, 1987) which won him the 1987 National Girobank Young Writer of the Year Award.

Musicals
 2019: Musik
 2018: Dusty - The Dusty Springfield Musical
 2001: Closer to Heaven

Television and film

2016:  Tracey Ullman's Show (BBC)  (2016 – present)
2009:  Octavia (ITV)
2008:  Beautiful People (BBC)  (2008–2009)
2004: Big Brother Panto (Channel 4) (2004-2005)
2004:  Coronation Street (ITV)  (2004 – present)
1999:  Murder Most Horrid (BBC)
1999:  Gimme Gimme Gimme (BBC) (1999-2001)
1996:  Beautiful Thing (Channel Four/Island World Productions)
1993:  West End Girls (Carlton)
1992:  Love Junkie (BBC)

Fiction
2012: All She Wants, Pan Books, 
2013: The Confusion of Karen Carpenter, Pan Books, 
2014: The Girl Who Just Appeared, Pan Books, 
2015: The Secrets We Keep, Pan Books, 
2016: The History of Us, Pan Books,

References

External links

1968 births
English dramatists and playwrights
Living people
English LGBT writers
Schoolteachers from Merseyside
English soap opera writers
British LGBT dramatists and playwrights
People educated at Liverpool Blue Coat School
English male dramatists and playwrights
British male television writers